Manfred Schanfarber Guttmacher (May 19, 1898 – November 7, 1966) was an American forensic psychiatrist and chief medical officer noted for his connection of psychiatry and criminal law. Among several notable cases, Guttmacher testified in the trial of Jack Ruby, and authored The Dog Must Wag The Tail: Psychiatry And The Law, America's Last King: An Interpretation of the Madness of George III and other works.

Guttmacher was born in 1898 in Baltimore to Rabbi Adolf (Adolph) Guttmacher, and Laura (Oppenheimer) Guttmacher, German Jewish emigrants. Like his twin brother, Alan Frank Guttmacher, his A.B. and M.D. degrees were earned from the Johns Hopkins University in Baltimore, Maryland, after which Manfred served as an intern at the Mt. Sinai Hospital in New York, then as a resident house officer in medicine at the Johns Hopkins Hospital. After two years an Emmanuel Libman fellow studying neurology, psychiatry, and criminology overseas, he relocated to Boston for psychiatric training at the Boston Psychopathic Hospital.
 
He was appointed chief medical adviser to the Supreme Bench of Baltimore in 1930, where he served until his 1966 death from leukemia.  In 1933, he published his first paper, Psychiatry and the Adult Delinquent in the National Probation Association Yearbook of 1933 (on forensic psychiatry).

He is seen as a contributor to the development of that field as attested by his books: 
Sex offenses, by Manfred S. Guttmacher, Norton, 1951
Psychiatry and the law, by Manfred S. Guttmacher (with Henry Weihofen), Norton, 1952
The mind of the murderer, by Manfred S. Guttmacher, Farrar, Straus, and Cudahy, 1960*The mind of the murderer. by Manfred S. Guttmacher, Grove Press, 1962
The mind of the murderer, by Manfred S. Guttmacher, Books for Libraries Press, 1973
The role of psychiatry in law, by Manfred S. Guttmacher, Thomas, 1968
Isaac Ray Award in 1957
The Salmon Lectures.

He had four sons: including Dr. Jonathan Guttmacher of Boston Richard Guttmacher of Washington, and Alan Edward Guttmacher.

Books by Manfred S. Guttmacher
Sex offenses, by Manfred S. Guttmacher, Norton, 1951
Psychiatry and the law, by Manfred S. Guttmacher, Norton, 1952
The mind of the murderer, by Manfred S. Guttmacher, Books for Libraries Press, 1973
The role of psychiatry in law, by Manfred S. Guttmacher, Thomas, 1968

References

Additional sources
Guttmacher MS: Adult court psychiatric clinics. American Journal of Psychiatry 106:881–8, 1950 Free Full Text
Eisenberg L. Obituary: Manfred S. Guttmacher, M.D. (1898-1966) American Journal of Psychiatry 1967 (February); 123(8):1029-1030.
Manfred S. Guttmacher Papers, 1928-1964 (inclusive). H MS c205. Harvard Medical Library, Francis A. Countway Library of Medicine, Boston, Mass. 
Alan F. Guttmacher papers, 1860, 1898-1974. H MS c 155. Harvard Medical Library, Francis A. Countway Library of Medicine, Boston, Mass.

1898 births
1966 deaths
American forensic psychiatrists
Johns Hopkins University alumni
People from Baltimore
Deaths from leukemia
American twins
American people of German-Jewish descent